Lafayette County may refer to several locations in the United States, each named in honor of the Marquis de Lafayette:

 Lafayette County, Arkansas 
 Lafayette County, Florida 
 Lafayette County, Mississippi 
 Lafayette County, Missouri 
 Lafayette County, Wisconsin 
 Lafayette Parish, Louisiana

See also
 Fayette County (disambiguation)